The Richardson-Brinkman Cobblestone House, located at 607 W. Milwaukee Rd. in Clinton, Wisconsin, United States, is a cobblestone house in Greek Revival style that was built in 1843. It has also been known as simply Cobblestone House. It was listed on the National Register of Historic Places in 1977. The listing included two contributing buildings.

Description and history 
The house has walls that are 16 to 18 inches thick. It has a one-and-a-half-story gable-roofed  by  section and a one-story gable-roofed  wing. Its Greek Revival features include a returned cornice, straight wooden lintels, and tooled limestone quoins. It was built in 1843 by Alonso Richardson.

References

Houses in Rock County, Wisconsin
Cobblestone architecture
Greek Revival houses in Wisconsin
Houses completed in 1843
Houses on the National Register of Historic Places in Wisconsin
1843 establishments in Wisconsin Territory
National Register of Historic Places in Rock County, Wisconsin